James Lloyd (born 1971) is the 1997 winner of the National Portrait Gallery's BP Portrait Award for portrait painting. Three of his portraits exhibited at the National Portrait Gallery, are:

 Maggie Smith
 David Alec Gwyn Simon, Baron Simon of Highbury
 Sir Paul Smith

He also held the Paul Smith scholarship at the Slade School of Art (1994–96).

References:

External links
James Lloyd's website
National Portrait Gallery - James Lloyd
awards and exhibitions - James Lloyd

1971 births
Living people
Alumni of the Slade School of Fine Art
British portrait painters
BP Portrait Award winners